The Violin Concerto No. 4 in G major (Hob. VIIa/4) by Joseph Haydn is one of the composer's three surviving violin concertos.

Background
There is some doubt as to whether or not Haydn wrote the violin concerto, although there is general agreement that he did earlier than assumed, as it is more "old fashioned" than his previously numbered violin concertos. As with his first violin concerto, it might have been written for Luigi Tomasini, concertmaster of the Esterházy orchestra, where Haydn was kapellmeister. Although having been called "uniquely beautiful," Haydn remarked, "I was no wizard on any instrument, but I knew the potentialities and effects of all. I was not a bad pianist and singer and was also able to play a violin concerto."

Structure
Scored for solo violin, string orchestra, and basso continuo. A typical performance lasts approximately 19 minutes.
Allegro moderato
Adagio
Finale: Allegro
The first movement is smooth, and plaintive, in sonata form, with concise phrases and ornate embellishments. This is followed by an aria-like middle movement, which weaves between major and minor keys. The movement, with its "unmatched intimacy and loveliness," is followed by a "high-spirited" monothematic sonata-rondo. The last movement, perhaps the most Haydnesque of all three movements, closely follows the galloping patterns and embellishments used by C. P. E. Bach in his music.

References

External links
 
 Recording of first movement, by Simon Standage, Trevor Pinnock, and The English Concert on Youtube

Haydn 4
Concertos by Joseph Haydn
Compositions in G major
1769 compositions